Be Exalted is the sixth studio album by Marvin Sapp and his third on Verity Records.

Track listing

Chart positions

References

2005 albums
Marvin Sapp albums